Iosif Damaschin (born 1 September 1963) is a Romanian former footballer who played as a forward. During his period spent at Rapid București in a match from Cupa României which ended with a 3–2 loss against Steaua Bucureşti with Damaschin scoring his team's second goal, Rapid's fans suspected that Steaua was being helped to win by the referees because of the influence of Valentin Ceaușescu who was a fan of the team and son of the dictator Nicolae Ceaușescu, so the fans started to chant: "Noi vi-l dăm pe Damaschin, voi ni-l dați pe Valentin!" ( "We give you Damaschin, you give us Valentin!"). This chant was considered a rebellion against the communist authorities, which was something rare during those times.

Honours
Rapid Bucureşti
Divizia B: 1989–90

References

1963 births
Living people
Romanian footballers
Association football forwards
Liga I players
Liga II players
AFC Unirea Slobozia players
FC Astra Giurgiu players
AFC Rocar București players
FC Rapid București players